The 1956 season was Wisła Krakóws 48th year as a club.

Friendlies

Ekstraklasa

Polish Cup

Squad, appearances and goals

|-
|}

Goalscorers

Disciplinary record

External links
1956 Wisła Kraków season at historiawisly.pl
Wisła in 1956 Ekstraklasa

Wisła Kraków seasons
Association football clubs 1956 season
Wisla